Mark Sheard Child FRS (born 17 August 1937) is a British chemist, and Emeritus Fellow of St Edmund Hall, Oxford.

Education
Child attended Pocklington School from 1947 to 1955. He earned his Doctor of Philosophy degree from the University of Cambridge in 1963 with a thesis on The vibrational spectra of electronically degenerate molecules.

Research
Child's research interests include semiclassical mechanics, Molecular collision theory, Rydberg states and Quantum Level Structures at a Saddle point.

References

1937 births
Living people
British chemists
People educated at Pocklington School
Alumni of Clare College, Cambridge
Fellows of St Edmund Hall, Oxford
Academics of the University of Oxford
Fellows of the Royal Society